The 2018 Men's Ford National Hockey League was the 20th edition of the men's field hockey tournament. The competition was held in various cities across New Zealand, from 9 to 23 September.

Capital won the title for the fifth time, defeating North Harbour 3–2 in penalties, after the final finished as a 1–1 draw. Canterbury finished in third place after defeating Auckland 6–1.

Participating Teams
The following eight teams competed for the title:

 Auckland
 Canterbury
 Capital
 Central
 Midlands
 North Harbour
 Southern

Results
All times are local (NZST).

Preliminary round

Fixtures

Classification round

Fifth to seventh place classification

Crossover

Fifth and sixth place

First to fourth place classification

Semi-finals

Third and fourth place

Final

Statistics

Final standings

Goalscorers

References

External links
Official website

Hockey
New Zealand National Hockey League seasons